Villa des Roses is a 2002 film by Frank Van Passel, adapted from the 1913 novella by Belgian writer Willem Elsschot and starring Julie Delpy, Shaun Dingwall, Shirley Henderson, Timothy West, Harriet Walter and Albert Delpy. It won Best Feature at the Hollywood Film Festival and was nominated for three awards at the British Independent Film Awards.

Delpy plays Louise, a young widow who starts work just before the First World War as a maid at the dilapidated Villa des Roses, an English-owned guest house in Paris, where she falls in love with a German artist played by Dingwall.

References

External links 

2002 films
Belgian drama films
English-language Belgian films
Dutch drama films
English-language Dutch films
Luxembourgian drama films
English-language Luxembourgian films
British drama films
Films set in the 1910s
Films set in Paris
Films based on works by Willem Elsschot
Films directed by Frank Van Passel
2000s English-language films
2000s British films